C. H. Sibghatullah (4 November 1913 – 14 May 1985) was an Indian politician who served as mayor of Madras from 1951 to 1952. He was an alumnus of the Madras Christian College.

Notes 

1913 births
Mayors of Chennai
Madras Christian College alumni
1985 deaths